Uchenna Kizito Okafor , often shortened to Uche Okafor (8 August 1967 – 6 January 2011) was a Nigerian former professional footballer who played as a defender. He made 34 international appearances for the Nigeria national team.

Club career
Okafor's club career took him to many countries before he settled in the USA. Okafor was drafted to Kansas City Wizards in the ninth round of the 1996 MLS Inaugural Player Draft, and played there for five seasons before retiring after the 2000 season.

International career
Okafor played every match when Nigeria won the 1994 African Cup of Nations, but sustained an ankle injury shortly thereafter. He was part of the squad to the 1994 World Cup but did not get any playing time. He played one out of their four games in the 1998 World Cup, though, as well as at the 1988 Olympics.

Post-playing career
Okafor coached for the Associated Soccer Group, a member of the North Texas Soccer Association. He was head coach for the 91 Gold Central boys team and the 93 HP Central boys team who play in the Plano Premier Select Soccer league.

Okafor was a regular pundit on African football on ESPN's coverage and their PressPass programme.

Death
Okafor's body was discovered by his wife in January 2011 shortly after he returned home from dropping off his daughter in school in their house in Little Elm, a town about 30 miles northwest of Dallas. The Tarrant County Medical Examiner's Office said that he hanged himself in an upstairs hallway. Okafor's family rejected the suicide ruling of the Little Elm Police Department, suspecting foul play.

Kent Babb, reporter for the Kansas City Star, published an in-depth analysis of Uche's death on 19 May 2012.

Honours
Kansas City Wizards
MLS Cup: 2000
Supporters' Shield: 2000

References

External links
 Uche Okafor  Nigerian Players
 

1967 births
2011 suicides
People from Owerri
People from Little Elm, Texas
Association football central defenders
Nigerian footballers
Nigeria international footballers
Africa Cup of Nations-winning players
1988 African Cup of Nations players
1994 African Cup of Nations players
1994 FIFA World Cup players
1995 King Fahd Cup players
1998 FIFA World Cup players
K.R.C. Mechelen players
Hannover 96 players
U.D. Leiria players
Maccabi Ironi Ashdod F.C. players
S.C. Farense players
Sporting Kansas City players
Igbo sportspeople
Nigerian expatriate footballers
Nigerian expatriate sportspeople in Germany
Expatriate footballers in Germany
Nigerian expatriate sportspeople in Portugal
Expatriate footballers in Portugal
Nigerian expatriate sportspeople in Israel
Expatriate footballers in Israel
Nigerian expatriate sportspeople in the United States
Expatriate soccer players in the United States
Suicides by hanging in Texas
Nigerian emigrants to the United States
Major League Soccer players
Major League Soccer All-Stars
ACB Lagos F.C. players
Sportspeople from Imo State